Eileen Rodgers (July 10, 1930 – July 13, 2003) was an American singer and Broadway performer.

Career
Born in Pittsburgh, Pennsylvania in 1930, she began her career as a nightclub performer, later singing as lead vocalist with Charlie Spivak's orchestra. She later recorded more than 30 singles and two LPs for Columbia Records, her most successful single being "Miracle of Love" in 1956, which reached number 18 and 24 respectively, on the Billboard and Cash Box pop charts.

Her Broadway debut was in 1959's Fiorello!, where she sang the show-stopping "Gentleman Jimmy". In 1960, she appeared in Tenderloin. Two years later, in 1962, she headed the off-Broadway revival cast of Cole Porter's Anything Goes in the role of Reno Sweeney, a recording of which is currently available on CD. The show won the New York Outer Circle Critics' Award as Best Revival of 1962.

In 1965, Rodgers appeared in the infamous musical flop Kelly which closed on Broadway after one performance. The Saturday Evening Post reported that Rodgers had burst into tears after a performance during the show's Philadelphia tryout, remarking, "I wish I was back in Tenderloin. It was a flop, but at least people were friendly." She served as a standby for Ethel Merman in the 1966 revival of Annie Get Your Gun. Rodgers made frequent appearances on television variety shows and starred with Art Carney in a Chevrolet 50th Anniversary special.

Death
Eileen Rodgers Thompson died of lung cancer on July 13, 2003 in Charlotte, North Carolina, three days after her 73rd birthday. She was survived by her husband, two sons and two grandchildren.

References

External links
  
 Obituary at TheaterMania.com

1930 births
2003 deaths
Actresses from Pittsburgh
American musical theatre actresses
Deaths from cancer in North Carolina
Deaths from lung cancer
Musicians from Charlotte, North Carolina
20th-century American singers
20th-century American women singers
21st-century American women